Beelzebub was the name of a deity worshipped in the Philistine city of Ekron.

Beelzebub(s) may also refer to:

 Beelzebub, a character from the video game Genshin Impact

Beelzebub (Sand Land), the main character in the Sand Land universe
Beelzebub Jones, a comic strip by Hugh McClelland
Beelzebub, the main character in the Beelzebub's Tales to His Grandson universe
The Beelzebubs, a cappella group from Tufts University
Beelzebub (manga), by Ryuuhei Tamura
Beelzebub, a character from the video game Helltaker
Bill Zebub, an American filmmaker and radio host whose stage name is Beelzebub

See also
"Beelzeboss (The Final Showdown)", a song by Tenacious D
Baalzebul (Dungeons & Dragons), a character in the Dungeons & Dragons universe
Beelzebubba, an album by the Dead Milkmen
Belzebub (crustacean), a genus of prawns
Baalzebub (spider), a genus of spiders in the ray spider family
Lord of the Flies (disambiguation), alternate name for the deity/demon
Belzebuth, a 2017 horror movie
Baal (disambiguation)
Zebul (disambiguation)